Lindsay Davenport was the two-time defending champion, but she withdrew due to injury.

Justine Henin won the title, defeating Alexandra Stevenson in the final 6–3, 6–0.

Seeds
The top four seeds who played received a bye into the second round.

Draw

Finals

Top half

Bottom half

Qualifying

Seeds

Qualifiers

Lucky losers

Draw

First qualifier

Second qualifier

Third qualifier

Fourth qualifier

References
 Main Draw (ITF)
 Qualifying Draw (ITF)

Generali Ladies Linz - Singles